Michael Paknanas the Gardener, aka Michail Baknanas (1753 – July 9, 1771) was a Greek gardener and martyr. He was canonized as St Michael, the new martyr.

Biography
He was born in Thission. Living during the Ottoman rule of Greece, Michael was approached by Muslim missionaries who attempted to convert him to Islam. He was tortured and eventually executed for his refusal to renounce Christianity.

Legacy
A street (Baknana Street) and a nearby tram stop in Neos Kosmos in Athens were later named after him. His feast day is held on June 30.

References

Further reading 

1753 births
1771 deaths
People from Athens